The 2003 CONCACAF Gold Cup was the seventh edition of the Gold Cup, the association football championship of North America, Central America and the Caribbean (CONCACAF).

For the first time since 1993, the tournament was held in more than one country, with games played in both United States and Mexico. The games were played in Mexico City, Miami, and for the first time in a northern U.S. city, Foxborough. The format of the tournament stayed the same as in 2002: twelve teams were split into four groups of three, the top two teams in each group would advance to the quarter-finals. Colombia and Brazil were invited, with the latter sending an Under-23 team.

The United States' Landon Donovan put four past Cuba in the quarterfinals in a 5–0 win, but the defending champions went out to Brazil in the semi-finals. The South Americans scored a goal in the 89th minute and added a penalty in extra time to win 2–1. Mexico won their first championship since 1998, beating Brazil 1–0 in extra time.

Qualified teams

Venues

Squads

The 12 national teams involved in the tournament were required to register a squad of 18 players; only players in these squads were eligible to take part in the tournament.

Group stage

Group A

Group B

Group C

Group D

Knockout stage

Quarter-finals

Semi-finals

Third place match

Final

Statistics

Goalscorers
4 goals

 Walter Centeno
 Landon Donovan

3 goals

 Kaká
 Jared Borgetti
 Brian McBride

2 goals

 Diego
 Steven Bryce
 Rolando Fonseca
 Erick Scott
 Lester Moré
 Daniel Osorno
 Carlos Bocanegra

1 goal

 Maicon
 Paul Stalteri
 Mauricio Molina
 Jairo Patiño
 Marvin González
 Gilberto Murgas
 Alfredo Pacheco
 Carlos Ruiz
 Julio César de León
 Onandi Lowe
 Andy Williams
 Omar Bravo
 Rafael García
 Rafael Márquez
 Juan Pablo Rodríguez
 Bobby Convey
 Eddie Lewis
 Steve Ralston
 Earnie Stewart

Awards

Winners

Individual awards

References

External links
Official Gold Cup Technical Report
Results and line-ups at rsssf.com
todor66.com

 
Gold Cup
CONCACAF Gold Cup 2003
International association football competitions hosted by Mexico
CONCACAF Gold Cup
CONCACAF Gold Cup
CONCACAF Gold Cup tournaments